Geographic information science (GIScience, GISc) or geoinformation science is a scientific discipline at the crossroads of computational science, social science, and natural science that studies geographic information, including how it represents phenomena in the real world, how it represents the way humans understand the world, and how it can be captured, organized, and analyzed. It is a sub-field of geography, specifically part of technical geography with applications to both physical geography and human geography; although its techniques can be applied to many other fields of study as well as many different industries. As a field of study or profession, it can be contrasted with geographic information systems (GIS), which are the actual repositories of geospatial data, the software tools for carrying out relevant tasks, and the profession of GIS users. That said, one of the major goals of GIScience is to find practical ways to improve GIS data, software, and professional practice; it is more focused on how gis is applied in real life as opposed to being a geographic information system tool in and of it self. The field is also sometimes called geographical information science.

British geographer Michael Goodchild defined this area in the 1990s and summarized its core interests, including spatial analysis, visualization, and the representation of uncertainty.  GIScience is conceptually related to geomatics, information science, computer science, and data science, but it claims the status of an independent scientific discipline. Overlapping disciplines are: geocomputation, geoinformatics, geomatics and geovisualization, which all fall into the geographic branch of technical geography. Other related terms are geographic data science (after data science)
and geographic information science and technology (GISci&T), with job titles geospatial information scientists and technologists.

Definitions 

Since its inception in the 1990s, the boundaries between GIScience and cognate disciplines are contested, and different communities might disagree on what GIScience is and what it studies. In particular, Goodchild stated that "information science can be defined as the systematic study according to scientific principles of the nature and properties of information. Geographic information science is the subset of information science that is about geographic information." Another influential definition is that by geographic information scientist (GIScientist) David Mark, which states:Geographic Information Science (GIScience) is the basic research field that seeks to redefine geographic concepts and their use in the context of geographic information systems. GIScience also examines the impacts of GIS on individuals and society, and the influences of society on GIS. GIScience re-examines some of the most fundamental themes in traditional spatially oriented fields such as geography, cartography, and geodesy, while incorporating more recent developments in cognitive and information science. It also overlaps with and draws from more specialized research fields such as computer science, statistics, mathematics, and psychology, and contributes to progress in those fields. It supports research in political science and anthropology, and draws on those fields in studies of geographic information and society.

In 2009, Goodchild summarized the history of GIScience and its achievements and open challenges.

See also 
 :Category:Geographic information scientists
 Geographic Information Science and Technology Body of Knowledge
 Geostatistics
Organizations
 Association of Geographic Information Laboratories for Europe
 National Center for Geographic Information and Analysis
 UCSB Center for Spatial Studies
 University Consortium for Geographic Information Science
 United States Geospatial Intelligence Foundation
Journals
 GIScience & Remote Sensing
 International Journal of Applied Earth Observation and Geoinformation
 International Journal of Geographical Information Science
 Journal of Spatial Information Science

References

External links 
 
 List of GIScience Conferences
 Conference on Spatial Information Theory (COSIT)

Geographic data and information
Geographical technology
Science and technology
Geographic data and information fields of study